The 'Gary' mango is a named mango cultivar that originated in south Florida.

History 
Gary was a seedling of the Carrie mango. It was named after horticulturalist and nursery owner Gary Zill. This continued a tradition of mangoes named after members of the Zill family, which include the Zill, Dot, and Carrie cultivars as well.

The Gary has been sold as a nursery stock tree in Florida. Gary trees are planted in the collections of the USDA's germplasm repository in Miami, Florida and the Miami-Dade Fruit and Spice Park in Homestead, Florida.

Description 
The fruit is small, averaging less than a pound, is of ovoid shape and has yellow skin.

References

See also 
 List of mango cultivars

Mango cultivars
Flora of Florida